Trần Đức Cường  (born May 20, 1985 in Vinh City, Nghệ An, Vietnam) is a Vietnamese footballer who plays as a goalkeeper for Vietnamese club Becamex Bình Dương.

He is second goalkeeper of Vietnam national football team played at 2008 AFF Suzuki Cup.

Club career

Becamex Bình Dương
Đức Cường signed a 2-year deal with Becamex Bình Dương in November 2015.

Honours
Sông Lam Nghệ An
V.League 1: 2000-01
Vietnamese National Cup: 2002
Vietnamese Super Cup: 2000, 2001, 2002
SHB Đà Nẵng
V.League 1: 2009; Runner-up 2005
Vietnamese National Cup: 2009
Vietnamese Super Cup: Runner-up 2009
Becamex Bình Dương
Vietnamese National Cup: 2018; Runner-up 2017
Vietnamese Super Cup: 2016; Runner-up 2019
Vietnam 
AFF Championship: 2008

References

Living people
1985 births
People from Nghệ An province
Vietnamese footballers
Vietnam international footballers
2007 AFC Asian Cup players
Song Lam Nghe An FC players
V.League 1 players
Association football goalkeepers
Footballers at the 2006 Asian Games
Asian Games competitors for Vietnam